San Joaquín is an elevated metro station on the Line 5 of the Santiago Metro, in Santiago, Chile. It is located close to the San Joaquín Campus of the Pontifical Catholic University of Chile. The station was opened on 5 April 1997 as part of the inaugural section of the line, from Baquedano to Bellavista de La Florida.

Like the rest of the first stations built on a viaduct in Santiago, San Joaquín was renovated to be capable of berthing 7-car trains. The renovation work was terminated in March 2013.

References

Santiago Metro stations
Santiago Metro Line 5